Bikash Sarkar (Bengali: বিকাশ সরকার) (born 27 May 1965 in Gairkata গয়েরকাটা) is a Bengali poet, writer, journalist and editor. He is a recipient of the prestigious Jugasankha Award 2010.

Biography 
Born in Gairkata, a suburb in Dooars region of West Bengal in the year 1965, Bikash Sarkar started writing poetry at a very early age. Later on, he also successfully tried his hand in writing stories and novels. Recently three of his books, ‘Bishaadbaalok’, ‘Anantachhutor’ and ‘Aaanandadotara’ have been published by Ananda Publishers. His first book of poem ‘Kanisker Matha’ (The Head of Kaniska) was published in 1983, when he was just 17 years old and now he has 23 books to his credit – 13 of poems, two collection of short stories, four of translations and four of novels. His poems have been translated into English, Assamese, Nepali and Hindi and published in several journals and anthologies. Bikash Sarkar was the editor of Masik Jugasankha, a Bengali monthly magazine. Now he is Assistant Editor of Dainik Jugasankha. Earlier he edited two little magazines named ‘Thaba’ and ‘Lekhakarmee’. He married Krishna Dey and his daughter is Bipasha, who is a teacher.

Awards and honours 
Sundarimohan Das Award 2000
Srijon Somman 2006
Jugasankha Award 2010
Assam Bhasa Gourav Somman, Govt. of Assam, 2021
Srot Somman 2022

List of publications 
KANISKER MATHA (কনিষ্কের মাথা) Poems 1983
PREMIK PREMIKADER JONYO (প্রেমিক-প্রেমিকাদের জন্য) Poems 1985
PHnASIGAACHH (ফাঁসিগাছ) Poems 1987
LENDU ROYER JIJEEBISHA (লেন্দু রায়ের জিজীবিষা) Novel 1995
JAAKE DEKHAMATRO GULI KORA HOBE (যাকে দেখামাত্র গুলি করা হবে) Short Stories 1996
KANISKER MATHA O ONYANYO KOBITA (কনিষ্কের মাথা ও অন্যান্য কবিতা) Poems 1999
JAADUR GAHANA AAKHAA (জাদুর গহন আখা) Poems 2000
AAGUNER SnEK (আগুনের সেঁক) Novel 2007 
GAIRKATASAMAGRA (গয়েরকাটাসমগ্র) Poems 2007
BISHAADBALOK (বিষাদবালক) Poems 2008 
NIRBACHITO KOBITA (নির্বাচিত কবিতা) Poems 2009 
ANANTACHHUTOR (অনন্তছুতোর) Poems 2010 
AANANDADOTAARAA (আনন্দদোতারা) Poems 2012 
NEELONTHEE BROJO (নীলকণ্ঠী ব্রজ) Translation 2013 
APARUP KATHA 1, 2, 3 (অপরূপ কথা ১, ২, ৩) Translation of Fairy Tales, 3 Volume) 2014
MANASAMANGAL (মনসামঙ্গল) Short Stories 2015
ASTRO (অস্ত্র) Novel 2015
SHRESTHO KOBITA (শ্রেষ্ঠ কবিতা) Collection of Best Poems, 2017
BIKASHJEEVON (বিকাশজীবন)  A Collection of writings about Bikash Sarkar, Edited by Gobinda Dhar 2018
LENDU ROYER JIJIBEESHA (লেন্দু রায়ের জিজীবিষা)   A collection of two Novels, 2020
HALLUCINATION SERIES (হ্যালুসিনেশন সিরিজ)   Poems 2020
GOLPOSOMOGRO 1 (গল্পসমগ্র ১)  Collection of Short Stories 2021
MUKHOMUKHI BIKASH SARKAR (মুখোমুখি বিকাশ সরকার)  Collection of Interviews 2021
DHnADHAADHONDO (ধাঁধাধন্দ)  Crime Thriller 2021
AATMOJEEVONEER PORABASTOB (আত্মজীবনীর পরাবাস্তব)  Poems 2021
100 PREMER KOBITA (১০০ প্রেমের কবিতা)  One Hundred Love Poems 2022
UPONYAS SANGRAHA (উপন্যাস সংগ্ৰহ)  Collection of Novels 2022

External links
https://web.archive.org/web/20120609233731/http://www.assamtribune.com/scripts/detailsnew.asp?id=mar2510%2Fcity07
http://bookwiseindia.blogspot.in/2010/03/jugasankha-literary-award-to-bikash.html
http://hungryalistwriting.blogspot.in/2015/04/bikash-sarkars-poem-head-of-kanishka.html
http://hungryalistwriting.blogspot.in/2015/04/bikash-sarkars-poem-call-translation-of.html
http://aamaaderbanglakabita.blogspot.in/search/label/Bikash%20Sarkar
https://www.youtube.com/watch?v=mO4avFoaoVQ
https://books.google.com/books?id=7lRWDwAAQBAJ&pg=PA66&lpg=PA66&dq=bikash+sarkar+poet&source=bl&ots=vs74ILmqCj&sig=ACfU3U2ZTR-uvPQJfy5EZ0Gjc42G1iXXdw&hl=en&sa=X&ved=2ahUKEwiA19GgoefgAhWMvo8KHU1UApg4ChDoATASegQICBAB#v=onepage&q=bikash%20sarkar%20poet&f=false
http://www.teestajournal.com/p/there-is-gairkatainside-kolkata-too.html

Bengali male poets
1965 births
Living people
Poets from West Bengal
20th-century Bengalis
21st-century Bengalis
20th-century Bengali poets
21st-century Indian poets
Bengali writers
Bengali novelists
Bengali poets
Bengali Hindus
People from Jalpaiguri district
21st-century Indian writers
Indian male writers
Indian poets
Indian male poets
20th-century Indian poets
Indian novelists
Indian male novelists
21st-century Indian novelists
Indian short story writers
Indian male short story writers
21st-century Indian short story writers
20th-century Indian short story writers
Indian editors
Indian magazine editors
20th-century Indian translators
Indian translators
21st-century Indian translators
Indian journalists
Indian male journalists
20th-century Indian journalists
21st-century Indian journalists
Indian newspaper journalists
Writers from West Bengal